Sir Francis Gawdy  (died 15 December 1605) was an English judge. He was a Justice of the King's Bench, and Chief Justice of the Common Pleas. His country seat and estates were in Norfolk.

Career

Family and name
Francis Gawdy was the third son of Thomas Gawdy, and was baptised Thomas Gawdy, as were his two elder half-brothers, Thomas Gawdy (d.1556) and Thomas Gawdy (d.1588). Francis then had his name changed at his Confirmation, establishing legal precedent that a name given at baptism could be changed at confirmation.

Legal education and progress
He may have studied at Trinity Hall, Cambridge, matriculating in 1545, but this record might rather be attributable to Francis's half-brother, the Thomas Gawdy who died in 1588. He was called to the bar at Inner Temple in 1549, becoming a bencher in 1558 and treasurer in 1571. He was Reader at Lyon's Inn in 1561 and at the Inner Temple in 1566 and 1571. He had an unremarkable parliamentary career, elected to represent Morpeth for the 1571 election, but focused mainly on his legal career. He was made Serjeant-at-law in 1577 and Queen's Serjeant in 1582, and as Queen's Serjeant opened the prosecution against Mary, Queen of Scots.

Marriage and estates

In 1563 he married Elizabeth, daughter of Christopher Coningsby. Sir Henry Spelman wrote (of Shouldham "Abbey") that "Sir Francis Gaudy of the Justices of the King's Bench was owner of it, he married [Elizabeth] the Daughter and Heir of Christopher Cunningsby Lord of the Manour of Wallington, and having this Manour and other Lands in right of his Wife, induced her to acknowledge a Fine thereof, which done she became a distracted Woman, and continued so to the day of her Death, and was to him for many Years a perpetual affliction." In this she believed he had cheated her out of her interest in Eston Hall, her father's home. He also obtained Fincham Hall (Fincham, Norfolk) and Wallington Hall (Runcton Holme, Norfolk), which had belonged to Elizabeth's father, Christopher Coningsby, the son of William Coningsby. Coningsby had been the Recorder in King's Lynn.

Later career
Gawdy succeeded his elder brother, the middle Thomas Gawdy, as a justice of the King's Bench in 1588. With John Clench, Francis Wyndham and William Peryam, he was one of the four justices appointed to hear causes in Chancery in the six months which intervened between the death of his kinsman the Lord Chancellor, Sir Christopher Hatton (20 November 1591), and the appointment of his successor, Sir John Puckering. 

He took part in many of the major trials of this period, including that of Sir Walter Raleigh in 1603, and was knighted the same year. Gawdy apparently expected to succeed Sir William Peryam as Lord Chief Baron of the Exchequer, but James I informed him he was being saved for a more senior position when it became available, and appointed Sir Thomas Fleming to that position instead.

Raising his granddaughter
The sole issue of his marriage was his daughter Elizabeth. In 1589, at Holdenby, she married Sir William Newport (a nephew and heir of Sir Christopher Hatton's), who changed his name to William Hatton (1560-1597): it was an occasion upon which Sir Christopher Hatton demonstrated his celebrated predilection for dancing. Elizabeth died during her father's lifetime leaving no male issue, but an only daughter, Frances (1590-1623), who was brought up by Gawdy himself. 

Sir William's second wife was Elizabeth Cecil, who, upon Sir William's death, remarried to that eminent jurist Sir Edward Coke. In February 1605, without her grandfather's approval, Frances was married to Robert Rich, who became Earl of Warwick in 1619, and after this marriage Gawdy broke off relations between himself and his granddaughter.

In August 1605 Gawdy was appointed Chief Justice of the Common Pleas, a position he did not live to enjoy, dying of apoplexy on 15 December at Serjeant's Inn.

Death and burial
After his death his body was brought from London to Wallington; it is said that they could find no place to bury his body as he was refused space locally. (Gawdy had depopulated the town around his hall and converted the church to a dog kennel or hay store.) As the smell of the body became offensive he was eventually buried without ceremony at North Runcton church and only paving stones were used to cover the grave. The parish register at North Runcton records that he was buried in the chancel by the local parson on 27 February (although the differing calendars would account for much of this apparent delay).

It was noted in 1829 that Wallington church was in ruins although the Hall was well repaired. Wallington Hall has been described as a "Tudor Rose in Bloom". The house still stands today in nearly  near King's Lynn and was valued at five million pounds in 2006.

References

Year of birth missing
16th-century births
1605 deaths
Chief Justices of the Common Pleas
Knights Bachelor
Members of the Inner Temple
Serjeants-at-law (England)
English MPs 1571
Alumni of Trinity Hall, Cambridge
Justices of the King's Bench
17th-century English judges
16th-century English judges
16th-century English lawyers